The Tiger's Coat is a 1920 American silent drama film directed by Roy Clements and starring Lawson Butt, Tina Modotti and Myrtle Stedman.

Cast
 Lawson Butt as Alexander MacAllistter 
 Tina Modotti as Jean Ogilvie / Maria de la Guarda
 Myrtle Stedman as Mrs. Carl Mendall
 Miles McCarthy as Andrew Hyde
 Frank Weed as Frederick Bagsby
 J. Jiquel Lanoe as Carl Mendall 
 Nola Luxford as Clare Bagsby

References

Bibliography
 Connelly, Robert B. The Silents: Silent Feature Films, 1910-36, Volume 40, Issue 2. December Press, 1998.

External links
 

1920 films
1920 drama films
1920s English-language films
American silent feature films
Silent American drama films
Films directed by Roy Clements
Films distributed by W. W. Hodkinson Corporation
1920s American films